Franklin is a city in Johnson County, Indiana, United States. The population was 23,712 at the 2010 census. The site of Franklin College, the city attracts numerous regional sports fans for the college teams, as well as audiences for its art events.

History
Franklin was platted in 1823. It was named after Benjamin Franklin. The Franklin post office was established in 1824.

Bethel African Methodist Episcopal Church, Franklin College Library (Shirk Hall), Franklin College-Old Main, Franklin Commercial Historic District, Franklin Senior High School, Greenlawn Cemetery, Herriott House, Johnson County Courthouse Square, Martin Place Historic District, Masonic Temple, and August Zeppenfeld House are listed on the National Register of Historic Places.

Franklin Wonder Five
The small town became nationally famous during the 1920s due to the outstanding athletic achievements of the local high school basketball team, who became known as the Franklin Wonder Five. A small group who had played together as boys, led by Fuzzy Vandivier and coached by Ernest "Griz" Wagner, they became the first high school team to win the state championship for three consecutive years (1920–22). The youths followed Wagner to the local Franklin College, where he became coach and they earned the title of national college champions in 1923. They turned down an offer to play against the top professional team, the New York Celtics.

Life magazine feature
The December 2, 1940 issue of Life magazine included a photo essay by Bernard Hoffman entitled, "A Small Town's Saturday Night," depicting farmers Glen and Norris Dunn and family on a typical Saturday night in Franklin: Dad getting a hair cut, and the kids seeing a movie at the Artcraft, people at the drugstore, as well as photos of other social spots, such as Nick's Candy Kitchen and the town's "lovers' lane." The nighttime photo showing double-parked cars and thick crowds on Jefferson Street is perhaps the best known of the set. According to the late-20th century critic James Guimond in his book on American photography, 
Since "Life" wanted a perfect Saturday night, and one they considered typical, the photographer did not select a town still blighted by the Depression... What "Life's"' readers wanted, it seemed, was a stereotyped village that confirmed their nostalgic beliefs about small towns in which no one is bored, poor, or lonely; and the magazine's photographers and editors - like Norman Rockwell in his "Saturday Evening Post" covers - gave them exactly that kind of town.

Geography

There are three small waterways in Franklin: Canary Creek and Hurricane Creek flow into Young's Creek. These creeks flood frequently.  Their small floodplain has been adapted as the basis of Franklin's green walkways and parks, which extend the entire length of the town. Hurricane Creek empties into Young's Creek in Province Park, downtown, which flows into the Big Blue River farther South. A buried stream, Roaring Run, flows beneath Franklin. In the June 2008 Midwest floods, all of these streams overflowed, damaging or destroying more than 100 houses throughout Franklin, including some entire neighborhoods. Since 2008, The city of Franklin has bought many of the flood-damaged homes, and cleared them to make more green space, and expand the parks system. Province Park is home to a small family cemetery of the George King family, one of the original founding families of Franklin.

Climate
The climate in this area is characterized by hot, humid summers and generally mild to cool winters.  According to the Köppen Climate Classification system, Franklin has a humid subtropical climate, abbreviated "Cfa" on climate maps.

Demographics

2010 census
As of the census of 2010, there were 23,712 people, 8,885 households, and 5,986 families living in the city. The racial makeup of the city was 94.9% White, 1.4% African American, 0.3% Native American, 0.8% Asian, 1.0% from other races, and 1.6% from two or more races. Hispanic or Latino of any race were 2.5% of the population.

There were 8,885 households, of which 36.9% had children under the age of 18 living with them, 48.6% were married couples living together, 13.4% had a female householder with no husband present, 5.4% had a male householder with no wife present, and 32.6% were non-families. 27.0% of all households were made up of individuals, and 11.9% had someone living alone who was 65 years of age or older. The average household size was 2.54 and the average family size was 3.07.

The median age in the city was 34.6 years. 26.3% of residents were under the age of 18; 10.5% were between the ages of 18 and 24; 26.6% were from 25 to 44; 22% were from 45 to 64; and 14.6% were 65 years of age or older. The gender makeup of the city was 47.7% male and 52.3% female.

2000 census
As of the census of 2000, there were 19,463 people, 6,824 households, and 4,872 families living in the city. The population increased by more than 50% during the 1990s (see table at right), with new residents attracted by jobs in the community, as well as some people commuting to Indianapolis for work. The racial makeup of the city was 0.2% Native American, 96.7% White, 1.2% African American, 0.51% Asian, 0.05% Pacific Islander, 0.59% from other races, and at least 0.81% from two or more races. Hispanic or Latino of any race were 1.31% of the population.

There were 6,824 households, out of which 37.6% had children under the age of 18 living with them, 54.7% were married couples living together, 12.5% had a female householder with no husband present, and 28.6% were non-families. 23.6% of all households were made up of individuals, and 8.4% had someone living alone who was 65 years of age or older. The average household size was 2.58 and the average family size was 3.04.

In the city, the population was spread out, with 26.0% under the age of 18, 11.5% from 18 to 24, 29.9% from 25 to 44, 16.8% from 45 to 64, and 15.8% who were 65 years of age or older. The median age was 33 years. For every 100 females, there were 88.3 males. For every 100 females age 18 and over, there were 83.4 males.

The median income for a household in the city was $45,414, and the median income for a family was $52,304. Males had a median income of $37,509 versus $25,601 for females. The per capita income for the city was $18,937. About 4.5% of families and 7.6% of the population were below the poverty line, including 7.7% of those under age 18 and 10.3% of those age 65 or over.

Attractions and economy
Several major international companies have operations in the city: Toyota, NSK, KYB and Mitsubishi. The city has worked to strengthen its international connections. Franklin is home of the first Ritters Frozen Custard, which has since franchised to several other markets. Franklin once had its own automobile factory, the Indiana Motor & Manufacturing Company. It produced the Continental brand from 1910 to 1913, and the Martindale & Millikan brand in 1914 and 1915. The Whitesides truck was also built in Franklin between 1910 and 1914

Downtown Franklin is noted for the number of well-maintained, older houses and early brick streets. Landmark buildings include the Johnson County Courthouse and the Artcraft Theatre. Due west of the Artcraft is RFD Franklin, a fine dining restaurant in the renovated former City Hall, a Colonial Revival building originally constructed in 1936 to be used as a post office.  It was designed by architect Louis A. Simon under Postmaster General James Farley. It was the original site of a federally commissioned Works Progress Administration (WPA) mural painted by Franklin artist Jean Swiggett, who started his career during the difficult years of the Great Depression. The WPA work was moved to the "new" post office when it was built by the federal government. In the 1980s, a private non-profit group, Franklin Heritage Inc., was formed by citizens to preserve and restore its historic assets for new purposes.  It now owns the Artcraft Theatre and is making it a community center for film, art, and special events. The current City Hall is located just east of the Johnson County Courthouse, and it also contains the Festival Country Indiana Visitor Center, which contains interactive exhibits that tell the story of the communities of Johnson County.

The Franklin Parks and Recreation Department maintains several miles of walking trails through the city, which connect various parks, community centers, the public library, and the public pool. Due to flood damage, the long park along the creeks was closed for the summer of 2008.

The city is the site of Franklin College, a four-year liberal arts college established in 1834 and the first in the state to admit women. Its students add to the life of the town and college events are open to the community.

The Daily Journal is the local newspaper in Franklin and also covers news in all of Johnson County.

Government
The government consists of a mayor and a city council of seven members. The mayor is elected by citywide vote. Five city council members are elected from individual districts, and two are elected at-large.

Education
Franklin Community Schools operates public schools serving almost all of the city, including Franklin Community High School. A small section in the north is assigned to Clark-Pleasant Community School Corporation, served by Whiteland Community High School.

Franklin has a public library, a branch of the Johnson County Public Library.

Notable people
Steve Alford, former Indiana basketball player, now head coach of Nevada.
 Austin Armacost, American reality television personality
 Clinton Lycurgus Armstrong, (b. 1844) Medal of Honor recipient for Siege of Vicksburg during the American Civil War.
 Homer Bone, U.S. Senator of Washington state (1933–44), was born in Franklin.
 Roger D. Branigin, governor of Indiana (1965–1969).
 Anthony J. Bryant, historian of Japan and translator.
 George Crowe (brother of Ray), was first Indiana Mr. Basketball in 1939, and played professional baseball with a variety of teams.
 Ray Crowe (brother of George), coach of Crispus Attucks High School basketball team that won state championships in 1955 and 1956, becoming first African-American team in nation to claim state title
 Andrew Duggan, film and television actor.
 Hal Fryar, actor and television personality.
 Gordon Johncock, 1973 and 1982 Indianapolis 500 Winner, resided in Franklin.
 Nick Hardwick, former center for the San Diego Chargers (2004-2014).
 Carol Jenkins, murder victim
 Marjorie Main, actress, portrayed "Ma Kettle" in the Ma and Pa Kettle movies. From nearby Acton, Indiana, attended Franklin College.
 Jon McGlocklin, professional basketball player, inducted to three honorary sports associations.
 Paul V. McNutt, governor of Indiana (1933–1937).
 Jesse Overstreet, U.S. Representative from 1895 to 1909, introduced the Gold Standard Act.
 Max Terhune, actor, appeared in National Barn Dance (1933) with Gene Autry.
 Forrest Tucker, film and television actor, star of TV series F Troop
 Fuzzy Vandivier, basketball player, elected to Basketball Hall of Fame.
 John Terrell Vawter, developer of Vawter Park Village at Lake Wawasee, half-uncle of noted architect of same name; donated Vawter Memorial to county
 Gene White, basketball player for 1954 state champion Milan Indians (inspiration for the movie Hoosiers)
 Thomas W. Woollen, Indiana Attorney General (1878-1880)

Sister cities 
Franklin currently has two sister cities:
 Kuji, Japan since October 1960
 Luqiao, China since April 2010

References

External links

 City of Franklin, Indiana website
 Franklin College

Cities in Indiana
Cities in Johnson County, Indiana
County seats in Indiana
Indianapolis metropolitan area
1823 establishments in Indiana
Populated places established in 1823